Strausberger Platz is a Berlin U-Bahn station located on the  line.

History
The station was designed by A. Grenander and opened in 1930. On 7 May 1944, the western concourse was directly hit. It was closed in 1945 after the station was destroyed during the Battle of Berlin. In 1952, the station was rebuilt.

The entrances were moved and a new one was built. In 2003, the station was renovated and green panels were attached to the walls.

References

External links

U5 (Berlin U-Bahn) stations
Buildings and structures in Friedrichshain-Kreuzberg
Railway stations in Germany opened in 1930